Neuland is a German typeface that was designed in 1923 by Rudolf Koch for the Klingspor Type Foundry.

Koch designed it by directly carving the type into metal. The original typeface thus had a great deal of variance between the sizes, something not followed in digital versions where the same font serves for every print size.

While originally intended as a form of modern blackletter, Neuland has come instead to be used as a signifier of the “exotic” or “primitive”, such as in the logos for Trader Vic's, Natural American Spirit cigarettes, promotional materials for The Lion King, and the Jurassic Park films (which use the inline variant); controversially, this has included an association with African or African-American themes.

A common variant of Neuland (perhaps more common than the standard variety) is Neuland Inline. Monotype licensed the design under the name of 'Othello' (released 1928) with the agreement that it would not be sold in Germany, Austria or Switzerland.

Phospor, by Jakob Erbar, was a contemporary and more regular competitor. Phosphate, an unofficial revival created by Red Rooster Fonts, is bundled with OS X.

Nick Curtis designed the JungleFever typeface, which based on the Neuland typeface.

References

External links 

 A collection of digital Neuland varieties

Display typefaces
Letterpress typefaces
Photocomposition typefaces
Typefaces and fonts introduced in 1923
Digital typefaces
Typefaces designed by Rudolf Koch